The Dakota Bowl is the North Dakota High School Activities Association football championship weekend played at the Fargodome in Fargo, North Dakota. The first "original" Dakota Bowl was in 1978 in Sioux Falls,  South Dakota.  Bob Burns coach at O'Gorman brought the game to life as a fundraiser for Sioux Falls Catholic Schools.  It has raised about 4 million dollars to date. It attracts over 10,000 fans yearly.

History
The Dakota Bowl began in 1993 with the opening of the Fargodome.  Prior to the Dakota Bowl, the football championship games were held at various sites across the state.  Beginning in 2002, with the opening of the Alerus Center in Grand Forks, the Dakota Bowl alternated between the Fargodome (odd years) and the Alerus Center (even years).  Starting in 2015, the Dakota Bowl will be held at the Fargodome until at least 2020.

Results

11-Man

Three Class System (1993-96)

Class A

Class B

Four Class System (1997-2020)

Class AAA

Class AA

Class A

Class B 9-Man (1993-2020)

Four Class System (2021-Present)

Class 11AA

Class 11A

Class 11B

Class 9B

Notes

External links
North Dakota High School Activities Association website

North Dakota high school athletics